The 2007 Blaupunkt SEAT Cupra Championship season was the fifth season of the SEAT Cupra Championship. It began on 1 April at Brands Hatch, and ended on 14 October at Thruxton, supporting rounds of the British Touring Car Championship.

Teams and drivers
Drivers in the main class drove the new Mk2 SEAT León and drivers in the Cupra R class drove the older Mk1 SEAT León.

Race calendar and results

Championship standings
 Points system applies to both classes.
 Drivers' top 18 results count towards the championship.
 Only half-points were awarded in Round 11.

(key)

Note: bold signifies pole position in class, italics signifies fastest lap in class

References

External links
 tsl-timing

SEAT Cupra
SEAT Cupra Championship seasons